Simon Peter Tilemann (1601, Lemgo – 1668, Vienna), was a German Baroque painter who was active Bremen, Kassel, and Italy.

Biography
According to Houbraken he first learned to paint flowers and he had a daughter who could paint flowers in watercolors.
He was a good landscape painter who spent many years in Italy, but later switched to portrait painting and who painted the portrait of Ferdinand III, Holy Roman Emperor while in Vienna.
Houbraken spoke with his grandson Bokelman who lived in Amsterdam and probably saw some of Tilemann's portraits and his daughter's (Bokelman's mother's) watercolors there. Houbraken mentions landscapes, statues, and flowers.
Houbraken engraved his portrait based on an engraving by Chr. Hagen.
According to the RKD he is mostly known for portraits in Bremen and genre scenes in Kassel.

References

1601 births
1668 deaths
German Baroque painters
People from Lippe
People from Lemgo